The article provides an overview of the entire chain of command and organization of the Hellenic Air Force as of 2018 and includes all currently active units. The Hellenic Air Force is commanded by the Chief of the Air Force General Staff in Athens.

The source for this article is the organization sections on the website of the Hellenic Air Force.

Administrative Organization 
The Hellenic Air Force is overseen by the Ministry of National Defense under the Minister of Defense Nikolaos Panagiotopoulos.

 Ministry of National Defence, in Athens
 Air Force General Staff, at Papagou Military Base
 Air Force Tactical Command (Αρχηγείο Τακτικής Αεροπορίας, ATA), at Larissa Air Base
 Air Force Training Command (Διοίκηση Αεροπορικής Εκπαίδευσης, ΔΑΕ), at Dekelia Air Base
 Air Force Support Command (Διοίκηση Αεροπορικής Υποστήριξης, ΔΑΥ), at Elefsina Air Base

Air Force General Staff 
The Air Force General Staff based at Papagou Military Base in Filothei is structured as follows:

 Air Force General Staff, at Papagou Military Base
 A Branch (Operations)
 A1 Directorate (Operations Planning - Operations)
 A3 Directorate (Exercises - Operational Training)
 A4 Directorate (Air Defense)
 A7 Directorate (Intelligence - Information Security)
 Operational Center
 B Branch (Personnel - Training)
 B1 Directorate (Military Personnel)
 B2 Directorate (Training)
 B3 (Personnel Management)
 B4 (Military Recruitment)
 B5 Directorate (Civilian Personnel)
 C Branch (Support) 
 C1 Directorate (Aircraft - Armament)
 C2 Directorate (Infrastructure)
 C4 Directorate (Communications)
 C5 Directorate (Information Technology)
 C7 Directorate (Supply)
 D Branch (Policy and Development)
 D1 Directorate (Organization)
 D2 Directorate (Defense Planning and Programming)
 D3 Directorate (Armament Programs)
 D6 Directorate (Financial Services)

The Air Force General Staff commands the following units and services:

 Air Force General Staff, at Papagou Military Base
 Air Force Academy, at Dekelia Air Base
 360th Squadron "Thales" – (T-41D Mescalero)
 251st General Aviation Hospital, in Athens
 Fuel Pipeline Management, in Eleftherio Larissa
 Fuel Base Antikyra
 Fuel Base Mikrothives
 Fuel Base Triadi
 Fuel Unit Aliartos
 Fuel Unit Modi
 Fuel Unit Rachon
 Aviation Medicine Center, in Athens
 Supreme Air Force Medical Committee, in Athens
 Air Force Project Service, at Papagou Military Base
 Air Force Finance & Accounting Center, at Papagou Military Base
 Air Force General Staff Support Squadron, at Papagou Military Base
 Air Force General Staff Computer Center, at Papagou Military Base
 Air Force Military Police, in Vyronas
 31st Search and Rescue Operations Squadron, at Elefsina Air Base (Special Forces)
 National Meteorological Service, in Ellinikon
 Air Traffic Information Service, at the Hellenic Civil Aviation Authority in Glyfada
 Air Force Insurance Service, in Athens
 Air Force Materiel Audit Authority, in Ampelokipoi
 Air Force Audit Authority Athens, in Ampelokipoi
 Air Force Audit Authority Larissa, in Larissa
 Air Force Treasury Service, in Athens
 Joint Rescue Control Center / Air Force Service, at the Hellenic Coast Guard headquarter in Piraeus

Hellenic Tactical Air Force 
The Hellenic Tactical Air Force based at Larissa Air Base is structured as follows:

 Hellenic Tactical Air Force, at Larissa Air Base
 A Branch (Operations)
 A1 Directorate (Operations Planning - Operations)
 A3 Directorate (Exercises - Allied Affairs)
 A4 Directorate (Air Defense Survival)
 A7 Directorate (Information Security)
 B Branch (Personnel)
 B1 Directorate (Military Personnel - Personnel Management)
 B2 Directorate (Education)
 B5 Directorate (Civilian Personnel)
 C Branch (Support)
 C1 Directorate (Aircraft - Armament)
 C2 Directorate (Infrastructure)
 C3 Directorate (Financial Service)
 C4 Directorate (Communications, Information Technology & Electronic Equipment)
 C7 Directorate (Supply)

The Air Force Tactical Command commands the following units:

 Air Force Tactical Command, at Larissa Air Base
 Air Operations Center, at Larissa Air Base, reports to NATO's Integrated Air Defense System CAOC Torrejón in Spain
 1st Area Control Centre, inside Mount Chortiatis
 2nd Area Control Centre, inside Mount Parnitha
 Air Tactics Center, at Andravida Air Base
 Fighter Weapons School
 Electronic Warfare School
 Joint Electronic Warfare School
 Air to Ground Operations School
 Tactical Support Squadron
 110th Combat Wing, at Larissa Air Base
 337th Squadron "Ghost" – (F-16C/D Block 52+)
 Unmanned Aircraft Squadron "Acheron" – (Pegasus II)
 111th Combat Wing, at Nea Anchialos Air Base
 330th Squadron "Thunder" – (F-16C/D Block 30)
 341st Squadron "Arrow" – (F-16C/D Block 50 in the Suppression of Enemy Air Defense role)
 347th Squadron "Perseus" – (F-16C/D Block 50)
 114th Combat Wing, at Tanagra Air Base
 331st All Weather Squadron "Theseus" – (Mirage 2000-5 Mk3)
 332nd All Weather Squadron "Hawk" – (Mirage 2000-BGM/EGM3)
 115th Combat Wing, at Souda Air Base, Crete
 340th Squadron "Fox" – (F-16C/D Block 52+)
 343rd Squadron "Star" – (F-16C/D Block 52+)
 116th Combat Wing, at Araxos Air Base
 335th Bomber Squadron "Tiger" – (F-16C/D Block 52+ Advanced)
 336th Bomber Squadron "Olympus" – (F-16C/D Block 52+ Advanced)
 117th Combat Wing, at Andravida Air Base
 338th Fighter-Bomber Squadron "Ares" – (F-4E PI2000 Phantom II)
350th Guided Missile Wing, at Sedes Air Base
 11th Guided Missile Squadron, at Heraklion Air Base – (S-300 PMU-1, TOR M1)
 21st Guided Missile Squadron, in Keratea – (MIM-104 Patriot PAC-3)
 22nd Guided Missile Squadron, at Skyros Air Base – (MIM-104 Patriot PAC-3)
 23rd Guided Missile Squadron, at Sedes Air Base – (MIM-104 Patriot PAC-3)
 24th Guided Missile Squadron, at Tympaki Air Base – (MIM-104 Patriot PAC-3)
 25th Guided Missile Squadron, at Chrysoupoli Air Base – (MIM-104 Patriot PAC-3, TOR M1)
 26th Guided Missile Squadron, at Tanagra Air Base – (MIM-104 Patriot PAC-3, Crotale NG/GR)
 Guided Missile Maintenance Squadron, at Sedes Air Base
 Guided Missile Training Squadron, at Sedes Air Base
 130th Combat Group, at Lemnos Air Base (rotational deployment of F-16 fighters and AS332C1 Super Puma SAR helicopters)
 133rd Combat Group, at Kasteli Air Base (rotational deployment of F-16 fighters)
 135th Combat Group, at Skyros Air Base (rotational deployment of F-16 or Mirage-2000-5 fighters)
 140th Operational Intelligence & Electronic Warfare Group, at Larissa Air Base
 1st Control and Warning Station Squadron, in Didymoteicho
 2nd Control and Warning Station Squadron, on Mount Ismaros
 3rd Control and Warning Station Squadron, on Mount Vitsi
 4th Control and Warning Station Squadron, on Mount Elati
 5th Control and Warning Station Squadron, in Kissamos
 6th Control and Warning Station Squadron, on Mykonos
 7th Control and Warning Station Squadron, on Mount Mela
 8th Control and Warning Station Squadron, on Lemnos
 9th Control and Warning Station Squadron, on Mount Pelion
 10th Control and Warning Station Squadron, on Mount Chortiatis
 11th Control and Warning Station Squadron, in Ziros
 380th Airborne Early Warning & Control Squadron "Uranos", at Elefsina Air Base – (Erieye EMB-145H AEW&C)
 Air Defense Information Center, at the Hellenic Civil Aviation Authority in Glyfada
 Instrument Flight Training Center, at Larissa Air Base
 Meteorological Center, at Larissa Air Base
Aktion Airport Detachment
Karpathos Airport Detachment
Chrysoupoli Airport Detachment

Air Force Tactical Command Structure Graphic

Air Force Support Command 
The Air Force Support Command based at Elefsina Air Base is structured as follows:

 Air Force Support Command, at Elefsina Air Base
 A Branch (Operations)
 A1 Directorate (Operations Planning - Operations)
 A8 Directorate (Education)
 A10 Directorate (Military Personnel)
 A11 Directorate (Civilian Personnel)
 Operations Center
 C Branch (Support)
 C1 Directorate (Transportation Support - Training Support)
 C2 Directorate (Infrastructure)
 C3 Directorate (Financial Service)
 C4 Directorate (Communications, Information Technology & Electronic Equipment)
 C7 Directorate (Supply Transport)
 C8 Directorate (Fighter Support - Armament)
 C9 Directorate (Quality Assurance)
 C10 Directorate (Factory Support)

The Air Force Support Command commands the following units:

 Air Force Support Command, at Elefsina Air Base
 112th Combat Wing, at Elefsina Air Base
 352nd VIP Transport Squadron "Cosmos" – (EMB-135LR EMB-135BJ, Gulfstream V, AB 212)
 354th Tactical Transport Squadron "Pegasus" – (C-27J Spartan)
 355th Tactical Transport Squadron "Atlas" – (CL-215)
 356th Tactical Transport Squadron "Hercules" – (C-130H Hercules)
 358th Search and Rescue Squadron" "Phaethon" – (Bell-205A1, AB 212, AW-109E)
 384th Search and Rescue Squadron "Puma" – (AS-332C1 Super Puma)
 113th Combat Wing, at Sedes Air Base
 383rd Special Operations & Air Fire Fighting Squadron "Proteus" – (CL-415GR, CL-415MP)
 206th Infrastructure Wing, in Ano Liosia
 Construction Wing (Planning)
 Construction Squadron
 Mobile Electrical Repair Group
 Mobile Underwater Plant Maintenance Group
 Mobile Disaster Response Team
 Mobile Aircraft Shelter Maintenance Team
 Mobile Runway Maintenance Team
 Mobile Air Conditioning Maintenance Team
 State Aircraft Factory, at Elefsina Air Base
 Telecommunications and Electronic Equipment Plant, in Glyfada
 Transport and Ground Equipment Plant, in Araxos
 Air Force Calibration Service, in Vyronas 
 201st Central Supply Depot, at Elefsina Air Base
 Main Repairable Materials Supply Depot, at Tanagra Air Base
 Main Supply Depot, in Araxos
 Main Supply Depot, in Valanidia
 204th Ammunition Supply Depot, in Avlida
 359th Public Services Air Support Squadron, at Dekelia Air Base (Fire fighting) (M18-B and M18-BS)
 Air Force Personnel Service Group, in Athens (Commissary management)
 Air Force Purchasing Service, in Ambelokipi
 Rhodes Airport Detachment
 Santorini Airport Detachment
 Air Force Publication Agency, at Dekelia Air Base
 Air Force Agency at Hellenic Aerospace Industry, in Tanagra

Air Force Training Command 
The Air Force Training Command based at Larissa Air Base is structured as follows:

 Air Force Training Command, at Dekelia Air Base
 B Branch (Personnel - Training)
 B1 Directorate (Military Personnel - Staff Selection)
 B2 Directorate (Ground Training - Military Schools)
 B5 Directorate (Civilian Personnel)
 B6 Directorate (Air Training - Operations - Exercises)
 B7 Directorate (Standardization - Staff Evaluation - Inspections)
 C Branch (Support)
 C1 Directorate (Aircraft - Armament)
 C2 Directorate (Infrastructure)
 C3 Directorate (Financial Service)
 C7 Directorate (Supply)

The Air Force Training Command commands the following units:

 Air Force Training Command, at Dekelia Air Base
 120th Air Training Wing, at Kalamata Air Base
 361st Air Training Squadron "Mystras" – (T-6A Texan II)
 362nd Air Training Squadron "Nestor" – (T-2E Buckeye)
 363rd Air Training Squadron "Danaos" – (T-2E Buckeye)
 364th Air Training Squadron "Pelops" – (T-6A Texan II)
 Sea Survival Training School
 124th Basic Training Wing, in Tripoli
 123rd Technical Training Group, at Dekelia Air Base
 Air Defense Training Center
 Air Force Museum
 Air Force History Museum
 128th Telecommunication & Electronics Training Group, in Kavouri
 Information Technology
 Telecommunication School
 Radar School
 Radio Navigation School
 Air Force Command & Staff College, at Dekelia Air Base
 Air Force Command and Staff Course
 Air Force Junior Officers School
 Foreign Languages School
 Flight and Ground Safety School
 Accident Prevention School
 Training Administration School
 Intelligence Officers School
 Nuclear Biological and Chemical Defense School
 Human Performance in Military Aviation School
 Air Force NCO School, at Dekelia Air Base
 Technical NCO Academy
 Radio Navigators Academy
 Administrative NCO Academy, at Sedes Air Base
 Dog Training Center, in Koropi

References

External links

 Hellenic Air Force Website
 Ministry of National Defence Website

Hellenic Air Force
Structure of contemporary air forces